Englisch or Englissh is a surname, a variant of English. Notable persons with that name include:

Berthold Englisch  (1851–1897), Austrian chess master
Lucie Englisch (1902–1965), Austrian actress
Michael Englissh, executor of Thomas Wood's will in benefaction of St Peter, Westcheap in 1503/4
Mighell Englissh, Master of the Mercers' Company in 1520 and 1527
It is also the German word for the English language.

See also
 English (surname)
 English language